Alessandro Devodier (Parma, 12 January 1991) is an Italian rugby union player.
His usual position is as a Lock and he currently plays for Rugby Noceto in Serie A after the professional experience with Valorugby Emilia in Top12.

References 

It's Rugby England Profile
ESPN Profile

1991 births
Living people
Sportspeople from Parma
Italian rugby union players
Rugby union locks